The Men's 100 m wheelchair race C was one of the events held in Athletics at the 1968 Summer Paralympics in Tel Aviv.

There were 26 competitors in the heat; 6 made it into the final.

The United States' Gary Odorowski achieved a time of 22.1 seconds, taking the gold medal.

Results

Heats

Final

References 

Wheelchair